The St Andrews Museum is a museum focusing on the history of the town of St Andrews in St Andrews, Fife, Scotland.

The Collection
The Museum holds a permanent collection of objects of historical value that are related to the town of St Andrews. It explores the history of the town from its beginnings to the present day; as well as also hosting temporary exhibitions.

References

External links
St Andrews Museum Official Website
Visit St Andrew Tourism

Local museums in Scotland
Museums in Fife
St Andrews